East Meadow is a hamlet and census-designated place (CDP) in the Town of Hempstead in Nassau County, on Long Island, in New York. The population was 38,132 at the 2010 census.

History
In 1655, two surveyors for Hempstead reported that the "east meadow" would be suitable for grazing. The area quickly became a grazing area for cattle and later, in the 18th century, for sheep. The sheep of the East Meadow area provided the country with more than 50% of the United States' wool needs during that time.

During the American Revolutionary War, East Meadow was occupied by British forces when they discovered the vast amounts of livestock herded there, and remained under their control until the end of the war. Two large farms existed in what is now East Meadow: the Barnum farm (Barnum Woods), and the Carman farm. It is rumored that President George Washington spent a night on the Barnum estate during a trip across Long Island in 1790. A toll booth was operated near the Carman homestead on the Hempstead Turnpike.

Another early settlement was located near what is now the intersection of East Meadow Avenue (formerly called Newbridge Avenue; not to be confused with nearby Newbridge Road) and Prospect Avenue.

The community was home to many Gilded Era estates. The old Hoeffner homestead is now the site of Veterans Memorial park, and East Meadow's Post Office. The Barnum estate was rented by the Hoeffner family in 1914. Part of the old Barnum farm is now the site of Barnum Woods Elementary School, and the main road that passes by the school, Merrick Avenue, was originally called Barnum Avenue. The Oliver and Alva Belmont (formerly Alva Vanderbilt) estate of Brookholt once stretched across several hundred acres on both sides of Front Street to the west of Merrick Avenue, and for a short while, included the Brookholt School of Agriculture for Women.

Carman Avenue is home to East Meadow High School, the Nassau County Correctional Facility, and the Nassau University Medical Center, the tallest building in Nassau County.

On March 11, 2004, President George W. Bush made a visit to East Meadow for the groundbreaking of a new memorial for the victims of the September 11, 2001 attacks.

East Meadow's name is derived from being the meadow of Hempstead Plains east of the Meadow Brook (originally a brook, now replaced by a parkway of the same name).

Geography

East Meadow is generally flat, and according to the United States Geological Survey and the United States Environmental Protection Agency, the elevation ranges from  near its southwestern edge, to  along Hempstead Turnpike to the north.

Almost no actual meadow remains in East Meadow or the Hempstead Plain, due to the boom of post-World War II development and later, unchecked suburban sprawl.

Demographics

As of the census of 2010, there were 38,132 people and 12,062 households residing in the CDP. (759.6/km2).

The racial makeup of the CDP was according to the 2010 census, 77.3% White, 5.2% African American, 0.1% Native American, 11.6% Asian, 0.04% Pacific Islander, 1.0% from other races, 1.9% from two or more races, 12.2% Hispanic or Latino. Non Hispanic whites were 69.8% of the population. The ancestries of residents of East Meadow are Italian (28.5%), Irish (17.5%), German (11.8%), Polish (8.8%), Russian (5.8%), United States (5.0%).

Of the 12,186 households, 35.8% had children under the age of 18 living with them, 67.2% were married couples living together, 9.0% had a female householder with no spouse present, and 20.8% were non-families. 17.9% of all households were made up of individuals, and 11.6% had someone living alone who was 65 years of age or older. The average household size was 2.94, and the average family size was 3.34.

In the CDP, the population was spread out, with 23.4% under the age of 18, 7.7% from 18 to 24, 30.1% from 25 to 44, 22.6% from 45 to 64, and 16.3% who were 65 years of age or older. The median age was 39 years. For every 100 females, there were 98.6 males. For every 100 females age 18 and over, there were 96.5 males.

The median income for a household in the CDP was $67,185, and the median income for a family was $74,691 (these figures had risen to $86,582 and $97,057 respectively as of a 2007 estimate). Males had a median income of $50,325, versus $35,422 for females. The per capita income for the CDP was $27,076. About 2.3% of families and 1.8% of the population were below the poverty line, including 4.1% of those under age 18 and 4.2% of those age 65 or over.

Economy
Getty Oil is based in East Meadow.

Snapple was previously headquartered in East Meadow, prior to moving their corporate office. The office space is now currently occupied by the Epilepsy Foundation of Long Island.

Lufthansa United States had its headquarters in East Meadow beginning in the 1970s, after it moved from Park Avenue in Manhattan, in order to save money. In 2019, the office had 206 employees; that year the headquarters moved to Uniondale.

Education

East Meadow's nine public schools are operated by the East Meadow Union Free School District, Town of Hempstead School District #3. The district was originally organized in 1812 and then formally organized as Town of Hempstead Common School District #3 in 1814 under the name "Brushy Plains", and at one time was the third largest school district in New York State.  The first school building was on Front Street (where the East Meadow Public Library building stands today).  Four successive schoolhouses stood at the corner of Newbridge Avenue (now East Meadow Avenue) and Front Street between 1814 and 1950.

Elementary schools

 Barnum Woods
 Bowling Green
 George H. McVey (previously Meadowlawn)
 Meadowbrook
 Parkway

Middle schools

 Woodland
 W. Tresper Clarke

High schools

 East Meadow High School
 W. Tresper Clarke High School

Closed schools
 Front Street School, once located at the corner of Front Street & East Meadow Avenue, burned down and replaced by the East Meadow Public Library.
 Prospect Avenue School, once located on the corner of Coakley Street & Prospect Avenue; students now go to Barnum Woods.
 Newbridge Road Elementary School, once located on Newbridge Road, between 7th Avenue & Lawn Drive, has been converted to condominiums. The concrete engraving reading "District No. 3 Public School" remains intact on the front of the building, now the Heritage Square apartments.
 McCleary Junior High School, previously Meadowbrook Junior High School, was located on Newbridge Road, in the lot adjacent to East Meadow's Wal-Mart. Has been replaced by a housing development.
 Salisbury School, building now serves as the district offices and alternative school

Houses of worship
 Christ Alive Church, 493 East Meadow Avenue
 East Meadow Beth-El Jewish Center, 1400 Prospect Avenue, Conservative synagogue
 East Meadow United Methodist Church, 470 East Meadow Avenue
 Holy Trinity Orthodox Church, 369 Green Avenue
 Long Island Muslim Society, 475 East Meadow Avenue
 St. Raphael Parish, 600 Newbridge Road, Roman Catholic Church

Landmarks
 East Meadow water tower
 Nassau University Medical Center, which dominates the "skyline."
 Nassau County Jail
 East Meadow Public Library
 Mitchel Manor military housing complex
 Eisenhower Park, which holds many events such as cultural nights, free concerts, the Carltun, and the attraction Safety Town

Movies filmed in East Meadow

 The Hot Rock (1972), aka "How to Steal a Diamond in Four Uneasy Lessons", footage filmed at the prison, showing the high school in the background.
 Let the Good Times Roll (1973), footage filmed in Modell's.
 Compromising Positions (1985)
 Married to the Mob (1988)
 Pieces of April (2003), scene in car with Krispy Kreme and Wal-Mart in background on Hempstead Turnpike.
 Enjoy the Show (2005)
 September 12th (2005)
 Knight of the Peeper (2006)
 Scum (2009)
 The Smurfs (2011)
 I Am Here (2016)

Notable people

 Eleanor Roosevelt, First Lady of the United States
 Criss Angel, magician-illusionist, stunt performer
 Arjun Atwal, PGA Tour golfer
 Adam Busch, actor-singer
 John Danowski, Duke lacrosse coach, three NCAA Championship titles
 Jim Drucker, former Commissioner of the Continental Basketball Association, former Commissioner of the Arena Football League, and founder of NewKadia Comics
 Julius Erving, basketball player
 Sam Farber, industrial designer and businessman
 William Fichtner, actor
 Raymond Gniewek, violinist
 Richard Greenberg, Broadway playwright
 Ron Heller, NFL coach and former offensive tackle
 Donald E. Ingber, cell biologist and bioengineer 
 Arthur Kurzweil, author, educator, editor, writer, publisher, and illusionist
 Annet Mahendru, actress
 Joy Mangano, entrepreneur, inventor of "Miracle Mop"
 Brandon Moore, NFL linebacker
 Rob Moore, NFL wide receiver
 Sterling Morrison, guitarist & back-up singer with The Velvet Underground
 Rich Ohrnberger, NFL football offensive lineman for the San Diego Chargers
 Denis Peterson, Hyper-realist painter
 Jan Rabson, voice over actor
 Fred Reinfeld, chess player, author
 Joel Rifkin, serial killer
 Louis Sachar, author
 Matt Serra, mixed martial artist, former UFC Welterweight Champion
 Stereo Skyline, former pop punk band
 Melinda Sullivan, dancer, choreographer, and actress
 Jenna Ushkowitz, actress (Glee)
 Frank Viola, MLB pitcher, winner of 1988 Cy Young Award
 Leslie West, musician, member of hard rock group Mountain
 Lee Zeldin, Republican United States Congressman, former New York state senator

References

Sources
 East Meadow, Its Past and Present, published in 1976 by the East Meadow Public Library
 East Meadow, Yesterday & Today, by Mary Louise Clarke, available at the East Meadow Public Library

External links

 East Meadow Chamber of Commerce official website

Hempstead, New York
Census-designated places in New York (state)
Hamlets in New York (state)
Census-designated places in Nassau County, New York
Hamlets in Nassau County, New York